The Rabbinical College of Pretoria (Hebrew Yeshiva LeRabbonus Pretoria) is a Chabad Yeshiva in Pretoria, South Africa. 
It was established in 2001 under the inspiration of late Chief Rabbi Cyril Harris. The Yeshiva was originally  headed by Rabbi Levi Wineberg, also joint Rosh Kollel of Kollel Bet Mordechai in Johannesburg, and internationally known for his annotated translation of the Tanya. It is now under Rabbis Chaim Finkelstein and Gidon Fox, with Rabbi Yosef Kesseleman as  Mashpia; and sometimes known as Machon L'Hora'ah Pretoria.

Structure
Since the Yeshiva focuses on semicha (ordination), all students have studied at other institutions for several years. 

After successfully completing the one-year programme, students receive semicha from both the Yeshiva and until his passing the renowned Posek Rabbi Zalman Nechemia Goldberg  (previously granted by Rabbi Yaacov Warhaftig of Machon Ariel in Jerusalem.) To date 98 Rabbis have been ordained at the Yeshiva.

There is a one-year “pre-Semicha” program as well, which covers practical areas of Halakha, Jewish Law, additional to the “regular” components of Semicha.

The Yeshiva is an important component of the Pretoria Jewish community - there is daily interaction between students and congregants, and one-on-one torah study with members of the community every evening.

See also
 Jewish education in South Africa under History of the Jews in South Africa
 Lubavitch Yeshiva Gedolah of Johannesburg
 Orthodox yeshivas in South Africa
 Tomchei Temimim
 Yeshiva Gedolah (Chabad-Lubavitch)

Further reading 
crownheights.info: “The Smicha Conundrum Solved: A South African Gem“
 shmais.com article: "A Miracle Takes Place in Pretoria, South Africa"
 SA Jewish Report: "Pretoria Yeshiva ordains another batch of bochrim"

References

External links 
main site: Yeshiva leRabbonus Pretoria
 previous site: Machon L'Hora'ah, The Pretoria Yeshiva
 List of Approved Yeshivot, rabbis.org (listed as Ariel Institute, Pretoria, South Africa)

Chabad yeshivas
Colleges in South Africa
Educational institutions established in 2001
Jews and Judaism in Pretoria
Orthodox yeshivas in South Africa
Schools in Pretoria
Jewish seminaries
2001 establishments in South Africa